The oil tanker MV Younara Glory is one of the world's longest ships. She was built in 2004 at the Daewoo Shipbuilding & Marine Engineering as the Delos. She was later renamed the DHT Condor, before her current name Younara Glory. She is a crude carrier with a deadweight of 320,051 DWT and gross tonnage of 161,235 GRT. The overall length of the ship is 333.00 m, the extreme beam is 60.00 m and the draft is 22.47 m. The cargo ship has total tank capacity for 340,584 cubic meters at 98%.

Engineering 
The main engine of the ship is MAN B&W 6S90MC-C with output power of 39,500 hp, achieved at 76 rpm. The output power together with the improved propulsion system and high-effective propeller, allow the cargo ship to operate with service speed of 15.0 kn. The maximum achieved speed during the trial tests was over 16.5 kn.

References

2004 ships
Oil tankers